is a Japanese manga artist. He is best known for his series Saikano (She, the Ultimate Weapon) and Kimi no Kakera. Inio Asano had a brief stint as his assistant during the creation of Saikano.

List of works
 Ii Hito (1993–1999)
 Bye Bye, Papa (2002)
 Suki ni Naru Hito (1999)
 Saishū Heiki Kanojo, aka Saikano (She, the Ultimate Weapon) (1999–2001)
 Love Story, Killed (2002)
 Kimi no Kakera (Your Fragment) (2002–2010)
 Hana to Oku-tan (2007–2019)
 Yuki ni Tsubasa (Wings in the Snow) (2011–2013), Weekly Young Magazine, 8 volumes
 Yuki ni Tsubasa Haru (2014–2015), Weekly Young Magazine, 8 volumes
  (2016–2018), Big Comic Spirits, 10 volumes
 Road to You -Kimi he to Tsuzuku Michi (short anime) (2017) — Character designs

References

External links
  
 

1967 births
Living people
Manga artists from Hokkaido